Georges Maurice Gerard Rostan (14 November 1938 – 26 March 2020) was a French actor.

Filmography
La Cuisine au Beurre (1963)
 That Tender Age (1964)
Les Racines du mal (1967)
Les Enquêtes du commissaire Maigret (1979)
Retour à Marseille (1980)
The Judge (1984)
Le Matelot 512 (1984)
Les Cinq Dernières Minutes (1989)
Les Collègues (1999)

Theatre
Fanny (1968)

References

External links

1938 births
French actors
2020 deaths